Stangeia xerodes is a moth of the family Pterophoridae that is found in most of mainland Australia, the Ryukyu Islands, Java and Sri Lanka.

The larvae feed on Cleome, Cajanus cajan and Acacia. The head is yellowish with an orange tinge, while the colour of the other segments is uniform pale yellow.

References

External links
Species info

Oxyptilini
Moths described in 1886
Moths of Asia
Moths of Oceania
Moths of Australia
Moths of Japan
Taxa named by Edward Meyrick